Omak Rock, also known as Balance Rock, is a balancing rock in the Colville Indian Reservation, in the U.S. state of Washington. It is positioned within the vicinity of the 1872 North Cascades earthquake, which it survived. The fact of its survival has been the basis of studies to help determine the acceleration and intensity of the quake. Some believe that the epicenter of the earthquake may have been very close to Omak Rock. The Confederated Tribes of the Colville Reservation believe that the rock represents a symbol of nature's perfection in the region.

References

External links 

Landmarks in Washington (state)
Glacial erratics of Washington (state)
Omak, Washington
Landforms of Okanogan County, Washington
Tourist attractions in Okanogan County, Washington
Individual rocks